Braya thorild-wulffii, the Greenland northern rockcress, is a plant species native to Greenland, Nunavut the Canadian Northwest Territories, and from the Chukotka Autonomous Okrug of eastern Russia.

Braya thorild-wulffii is an herb up to 10 cm tall, sometimes hairy, sometimes not. Leaves are spatula-shaped, up to 4 cm long. Flowers are white to purplish, up to 10 mm in diameter. Fruits spherical or egg-shaped, up to 10 mm in diameter.

References

thorild-wulffii
Flora of Greenland
Flora of Nunavut
Flora of Russia
Flora of the Northwest Territories
Flora without expected TNC conservation status